The 2013 Irish budget was the Irish Government budget for the 2013 fiscal year, presented to Dáil Éireann on 5 December 2012. It was the second budget of the 29th Government of Ireland.

The budget saw the introduction of the local property tax at rates of 0.18% per annum and 0.25% per annum.
Child benefit will be cut by €10 a month with €61m cuts in other household benefits. College fees will also rise in the next year by €250 a student while motor tax will also increase.
A packet of 20 cigarettes increases by 10-cent while excise duty on a pint or beer or cider will increase by 10-cent, on a standard measure of spirits by 10-cent, and on a bottle of wine by €1.

On 13 December 2012, Labour Party TD Colm Keaveney voted against the government on cuts to the respite care grant leading to his loss of the party whip.

References

External links
Irish budget, 2013 at Department of Finance
Money Guide Ireland guide to the 2013 Budget
Irish budget, 2013 at RTE
Irish budget, 2013 at Finfacts
 Irish budget, 2013 at Irish Examiner

2012 in Irish politics
Budget
2013 government budgets
2013 in Irish politics
Budget
31st Dáil
13
Michael Noonan (Fine Gael politician)